Gary Byrne is an American politician and businessman serving as a member of the Indiana Senate from the 47th district. He assumed office on February 14, 2022.

Career 
Byrne has been the president and co-owner of Byrne Satellite Systems since 1983. He was appointed to the Indiana Senate in February 2022, succeeding Erin Houchin. He will run for a full term in November 2022.

References 

Living people
Republican Party Indiana state senators
Year of birth missing (living people)